Orachrysops nasutus, the nosy blue, is a butterfly of the family Lycaenidae. It is found in South Africa.

The wingspan is 30–38 mm for males and 25–39 mm for females. Adults are on wing from December to January. There is one generation per year.

The larvae feed on Indigofera cuneifolia.

Subspecies
 Orachrysops nasutus nasutus (high altitude montane grassland in the Amatolas and the southern Drakensberg in the Eastern Cape)
 Orachrysops nasutus remus Henning & Henning, 1994 (Lesotho to the south-eastern KwaZulu-Natal Drakensberg)

References

Butterflies described in 1994
Orachrysops